Hua Runhao (born 6 March 1996) is a Chinese tennis player.

Hua has a career high ATP singles ranking of 617 achieved on 27 May 2019. He also has a career high ATP doubles ranking of 269 achieved on 9 September 2019. He has reached 6 doubles finals, posting a record of 3 wins and 3 losses which includes 1 final on the ATP Challenger Tour. He has yet to reach a singles final at any senior level.

Hua made his ATP main draw debut when he was granted a wild card entry at the 2018 China Open in the doubles draw partnering compatriot Zhang Zhizhen, where they would be defeated in the first round by Ivan Dodig and Nikola Mektic in straight sets 3–6, 4–6.

ATP Challenger and ITF Futures finals

Doubles: 9 (4–5)

External links

1996 births
Living people
Chinese male tennis players
Tennis players from Shanghai
21st-century Chinese people